Gestern. Heute. (English: Yesterday. Today.) is the second compilation album by Austrian singer Christina Stürmer. Compromising all of her studio albums, it was released on 15 May 2015 by Universal Music.

Track listing

Charts

Weekly charts

Year-end charts

Certifications

References

External links 
 

Christina Stürmer albums
2015 albums
German-language albums